The Portland Winter Light Festival is an annual winter light festival in Portland, Oregon. Each year has been presented by the local nonprofit Willamette Light Brigade. The festival is open to the public and free to attend.

Past events

2016
The event, first held in 2016, featured over 40 light-based art installations, performances by the Last Regiment of Syncopated Drummers, Circus Luminescence and Flamebuoyant and took place around OMSI, The Oregon Rail Heritage Museum and the Portland Spirit. Over 33,000 people were in attendance.

2017
Between the river and the stars. 

The 2017 festival was held primarily along the waterfront by the Oregon Museum of Science and Industry, The Oregon Rail Heritage Museum and the Portland Spirit and across the Willamette River at Zidell Yards, and had smaller installations throughout the city. This year had the official theme of "Between the River and the Stars". Over 48,000 people attended in its second year and over 70 artists, performers, and creators participated. Zidell Yards was the site of the Fire Art Garden, and the Art Lantern Parade made its way along Southeast Water Avenue and the Eastbank Esplanade. Educational speakers held panels every night as part of the Light Science Talks showcase. Entertainment along the 1.5-mile route included the Flash Bang Band and Misty Krewe of Nimbus. 2017 also marked a collaboration with the Portland Streetcar transit system which offered free rides to everyone during the event.

2018
The Light of Progress.

The 2018 festival was held on February 1–3, 2018. Art installations were held along the Willamette River and various locations throughout Portland. Artists included the Portland Opera, Ivan McLean and BodyVox. There were over 100 public art installations, 73 performers, and 12 educational speakers and workshops. Over 142,000 people visited the festival in 2018.

2019
Forward. 

From February 7-9 2019, over 156,000 attendees visited the 2019 festival sites.

2020
Into the Dreamscape. 

Taking place February 6-8 2020, the festival saw over 210,000 attendees visit the sites along the Willamette River and other locations throughout Portland. There were nearly 100 public art installations, 78 performances, educational speakers and live events, and 380 volunteers.

2021
(non)Festival. 

During the COVID-19 pandemic, festival organizers pivoted to a 'socially distanced' version of the event with the "Portland Winter Light (non)Festival". The event was held over two weekends to prevent crowds from gathering at any specific artworks, and art installations were located in each quadrant of the city. The (non)Festival ran from February 5-6 and February 12-13, 2021. According to Executive Director Alisha Sullivan, “When we approached local businesses, organizations and artists about moving ahead with this year’s experience, we weren’t sure what the response would be – but we were amazed by the positive reaction. It’s clear that everyone is craving a sense of placemaking and civic engagement.”

2022
Within the Ecosystem. 

Scheduled for February 4-12, 2022, the festival is returning for a seventh year as a decentralized city event with pop-up art in windows, businesses, and unusual spaces, encouraging guests to explore the city to view art while allowing for equitable access for more families and guests. Pop-ups will be interspersed with large, dynamic anchor art installations. This replicates the successful model of 2021, where the festival adapted to the current pandemic climate by pivoting towards touch-free installations, encouraging community celebration while adhering to COVID guidelines.

Reception
Stephanie Yao Long of The Oregonian called the event "playful and wondrous". Martin Cizmar of the Willamette Week wrote, "This new event makes good use of the new Tilikum Crossing Bridge, not to mention the long, dark winter nights our latitude ensures."

In May 2017, the festival was featured on OPB's Oregon Art Beat television show, which stated "An easy walk along the Eastside Esplanade allows a visitor to take in everything from elaborate interactive LED sculptures to large-scale projection mapping to post-apocalyptic, fire-powered spaceships."

A feature in Amex Essentials highlighted the Portland Winter Light Festival.  The event was the sole American festival to be included.

References

External links

 
 

2016 establishments in Oregon
Annual events in Portland, Oregon
Art in Portland, Oregon
Festivals established in 2016
Festivals in Portland, Oregon
Winter festivals in the United States